May Allison (born October 29, 1964 in Toronto, Ontario) is a former long-distance runner from Canada.

Allison represented Canada at the 1996 Summer Olympics in Atlanta, Georgia. There she finished the women's marathon in 52nd place.

Achievements
All results regarding marathon, unless stated otherwise

References
 Canadian Olympic Committee

External links
 
 
 
 
 

1964 births
Living people
Canadian female marathon runners
Athletes (track and field) at the 1996 Summer Olympics
Olympic track and field athletes of Canada
Athletes from Toronto
World Athletics Championships athletes for Canada
20th-century Canadian women